The Czechoslovak Army (Czech and Slovak: Československá armáda) was the name of the armed forces of Czechoslovakia. It was established in 1918 following Czechoslovakia's declaration of independence from Austria-Hungary.

History
In the first months of the World War I, the response of the Czech soldiers and civilians to the war and mobilisation efforts of Austria-Hungary were highly enthusiastic as it was expected to be a short war, however it turned into apathy later. 
In the first week after the declaration of independence the Army of the new Czechoslovak state consisted mainly of Czech and Slovak units of Austro-Hungarian Army while it also incorporated members of the Czechoslovak Legion from Italy and France. that fought alongside the Entente during World War I. Czechoslovak Army took part in the brief Polish-Czechoslovak War in which Czechoslovakia annexed the Zaolzie region from Poland. And also fought border war with Hungary for control and borders of Slovakia. The Army was modeled after the Austia-Hungarian Army with influence of the French Military Mission to Czechoslovakia. Officers were both former Austro-Hungarian and Legion officers that decided to stay in the active service. First chief of the Main Staff was French General Maurice Pellé. 

In the interbellum the force was fairly modern by contemporary standards, with the core of the force formed by 4 fast divisions equipped in the late 1930s with LT vz. 35 tanks, as well as an extensive system of border fortifications. Partly Mobilised after Anschluss and fully during the Munich Conference, the force did not take part in any organised defence of the country against invading Germans due to international isolation of Czechoslovakia and was demobilized gradually until February 1939.

The army was disbanded following the German takeover of Czechoslovakia in 1939. During World War II the Czechoslovak Army was recreated in exile, first in the form of the new Czechoslovak Legion fighting alongside of Poland during the Invasion of Poland and then in the form of forces loyal to the London-based Czechoslovak government-in-exile.

After the war Czechoslovak units fighting alongside the Allies returned to Czechoslovakia and formed the core of the new, recreated Czechoslovak Army. However, with the Communist takeover of Czechoslovakia, it was being increasingly Sovietised and in 1954 was formally renamed to Czechoslovak People's Army. The army of Czechoslovakia returned to the former name in 1990, following the Velvet Revolution, but in 1993, following the Dissolution of Czechoslovakia, it was disbanded and split into modern Army of the Czech Republic and the Slovak Armed Forces.

See also
War College (Prague)

References

Military history of Czechoslovakia
Military units and formations established in 1918
Military units and formations disestablished in 1992